The Copper Nunataks are a cluster of nunataks  across, situated at the head of Wetmore Glacier,  west-southwest of Mount Crowell, in southern Palmer Land. The group was mapped by the United States Geological Survey (USGS) from surveys and from U.S. Navy tricamera aerial photography, 1961–67. The name was given by Peter D. Rowley, USGS geologist to this area (1970–71 and 1972–73), who reported that the nunataks contain the largest known copper deposits in Antarctica.

References 

Nunataks of Palmer Land